Oru Mexican Aparatha (English: A Mexican Crime) is a 2017 Indian Malayalam-language political drama film directed by Tom Emmatty. The film stars Tovino Thomas, Neeraj Madhav and Roopesh Peethambaran. It was released on 3 March 2017 in India.The movie was a blockbuster at the box office and served as a major breakthrough for Thomas as it established him as one of the biggest leading star in malayalam cinema.

Plot
Sakhavu Kochaniyan is a strong leftist who during The Emergency period, conducted a successful protest and established the SFY  party in the famous Maharaja's College, Ernakulam. However, he soon is betrayed by a comrade and killed by the police, shouting the phrase 'Inquilab Zindabad!' to his last breath.

Now, set in mid 2000s, the college is now under the leadership of the KSQ  activist Roopesh, Shiyaz and their fellow activists. Paul is a student from Thrissur who has come to the college to study. He is a typical student and becomes friends with Subhash, Joby and Krishnan, and soon starts to fall in love Anu. Subhash has long hated the KSQ's leadership and their abuse of power in the college, and plans to re-introduce the SFY party in the college before the next election. Subhash is shown as a clever, left-wing ideologist, and tries to bring his friends, including Paul, into the party. Krishnan, who came from Irinjalakuda, is also seen as a strong figure, but not completely absorbed in the leftist ideology. There is eventually a skirmish between Subhash's gang and a bunch of people lead by KSQ activist Kanjan, but it's stopped safely.

Meanwhile, Paul tells Anu that he loves her, and she tells him, as a joke, that she loves him back. Paul falls under the illusion that it's real love and not friendship. In a local Kalolsavam, Roopesh and his party select the students who are taking part, but they reject a girl who wants to take part in 4 activities. Seeing this, Subhash decides to sign the girl up for the kalotsavam without the others knowing.

Cast

Differences from History

In real life, Jino John, a Kerala Students Union (KSU, which is shown to be KSQ in the film) representative, won against the left-aligned Students' Federation of India (SFI, depicted as SFY in film) candidate in the Maharajas College union elections on 1 October 2010. It was after almost 30 years that a KSU leader became the chairman of Maharajas College. Jino also acted in the movie as a KSQ activist. Indian diplomat Venu Rajamony was the last person who was elected as the Chairman from the panel of KSU during 1980-81. Many criticised it as a rewriting of very recent history in favour of left-wing politics using the convenience of cinematic liberty. Even though the convention of creating martyrs by the leftist politicians for political gains is shown in the film, it was twisted to be the plan of a wicked member of the party in the climax, again in favour of leftist agenda.

A leftist leader named Kochaniyan is shown to be studying at the same college at Ernakulam in the flashback of the film. But the real Kochaniyan was a student of Sri C. Achutha Menon Government College, Thrissur, and he was member of SFI Thrissur district committee and also the college Union General secretary and he killed by KSU activist in calicut university art fest.

Filming 
The film was shot mainly in Maharaja's College, Ernakulam and FACT in Kochi.

Soundtrack

Reception
The film grossed 2.07 crore in the opening day at Kerala box office with a distributor's share of 98 lakh. Asianet bought the Satellite rights of the film for an amount of 3.25 crores. The producer Anoop Kannan earned approximately 10 crores profit from this movie.

References

External links 
 

2017 films
Indian political drama films
Films about communism
Films shot in Kochi
2010s Malayalam-language films